"Forever Yours (Tribute)" is a song by Norwegian DJ Kygo, Swedish DJ Avicii and Swedish singer and songwriter Sandro Cavazza. The song was released on 24 January 2020. The song was written by Sting, Jan Kask, Dominic Miller, Tim Bergling, Sebastian Furrer, Kygo, Sandro Cavazza and Marcus Thunberg Wessel.

Background
Forever Yours is originally a song that Avicii started working on in Malibu in March 2016 after Sandro showed him his demo. At the time, Avicii was taking a roadtrip from Los Angeles to Miami to work on new music that he would premiere at Ultra Music Festival that year. Forever Yours was one of several songs worked on during this trip.

Later in 2016 Avicii played another version of the track at his Ushuaia closing set.

However, Avicii could not release a final version of the song before his death. Norwegian DJ Kygo and Swedish singer and songwriter Sandro Cavazza got the opportunity to officially finish what Avicii had started. Although the entire production was remade from scratch, Sandro and Kygo took the liberty to use Avicii’s chords from the well known UMF 2016 version. In December 2019, the two artists performed the song live at the Avicii tribute concert, all but ensuring the project had reached completion at long last. Sandro Cavazza previously featured on Avicii's 2017 single "Without You" and featured on two songs from Avicii's 2015 album Stories, "Gonna Love Ya" and "Sunset Jesus". Sting and Dominic Miller are also credited as "Forever Yours" samples Sting's song "Shape of My Heart."

Charts

Weekly charts

Year-end charts

References

2020 singles
2020 songs
Avicii songs
Kygo songs
Sandro Cavazza songs
Song recordings produced by Avicii
Song recordings produced by Kygo
Songs released posthumously
Songs written by Avicii
Songs written by Kygo
Songs written by Sandro Cavazza
Songs written by Sting (musician)